Baba Adam's Mosque is a mosque situated in the village of Qadi Qasbah under Rampal Union of Bangladesh's Munshiganj District. It was constructed in 1483 A.D by Malik Kafur to function as a Jami mosque during the reign of Jalaluddin Fateh Shah. The tomb of Baba Adam Shahid, a 15th-century Muslim preacher, lies near the edifice.

History

According to the Arabic calligraphy inscription fixed aloft the central doorway in the east, the mosque was built in Rajab 888 A.H (August/September 1483 AD) during the reign of the Sultan of Bengal Jalaluddin Fateh Shah. It was constructed by Malik al-Muʿazzam Malik Kafur, one of the Sultan's officers. According to historian Ahmad Hasan Dani, Kafur was of Abyssinian origin. Now a protected monument under the Department of Archaeology, the mosque has been renovated and remains in a good state of preservation.

Architecture 
Split into two aisles and three bays, the rear of the wall on the west is displayed in three steps of which the middle part contains a multi-cusped ornamental arch-panel. The brick building is roofed over by six identical domes divided into two rows. Two freestanding slender octagonal-based black basalt pillars have chain and bell motifs. Stone pillars hold the pointed two-centred arches of the six domes.

All the entrances and mihrabs are recessed within rectangular frames. The south and north walls contain rectangular niches. The multi-domed mosque does not have a minaret. On both sides of the central doorway there are two multi-cusped rectangular panels. The arches are supported on faceted small pillars and decorated with a beautiful terracotta floral design and a hanging motif. This type of facade decoration is also found in Shahzadpur Mosque (Sirajganj).

Gallery

See also
Bengal Sultanate

References

External links

Bengal Sultanate mosques
Munshiganj District
Religious buildings and structures completed in 1483
Mosques in Bangladesh